Riverside-Thomas Cemetery is a historical cemetery located in Bingham County, Idaho.  The cemetery was unofficially established by the first interment of James William Parsons who died on June 6, 1887. The cemetery has a capacity of 6,874 deceased persons. The Riverside-Thomas Cemetery District was officially established January 26, 1931.

References

External links
 
 

Bingham County, Idaho
Cemeteries in Idaho